Seven ships of the Royal Navy have been named HMS Arrow, after the projectile:

 , a 20-gun sloop launched in 1796 that the French frigates  and  captured near Gibraltar on 4 February 1805; she sank the same day
 , a 14-gun cutter launched at Deptford Dockyard on 7 September 1805, and converted to a breakwater in May 1815. Broken up in May 1828.
 , a 10-gun cutter launched at Portsmouth on 14 March 1823 and broken up in January 1852.
 , a 477-ton  wooden screw dispatch vessel launched at Leamouth on 26 June 1854 and sold on 19 May 1862.
 , an Ant-class iron gunboat launched at Greenwich on 22 April 1871 and sold on 1 March 1922.
 , launched 1929, was an  destroyer that served in World War II and was damaged beyond repair in Algiers harbour in 1944 when an ammunition ship exploded. The hulk was broken up in May 1949.
 , launched 1974, was a Type 21 frigate that served in the Falklands War. She was sold to Pakistan in 1994 and renamed .

The Royal Australian Navy 146-ton patrol boat  was launched on 17 February 1968 and was wrecked on 25 December 1974 at Darwin, Australia during Cyclone Tracy.

Battle honours
Ships named Arrow have earned the following battle honours:
Copenhagen, 1801
Cape Tenez, 1805
San Sebastian, 1813
Crimea, 1854−55
Norway, 1940
Atlantic, 1940−43
North Sea, 1942
Libya, 1942
Malta Convoys, 1942
Sicily, 1943
Falkland Islands, 1982

References

Royal Navy ship names